Estonia (ISF code: EST) has competed at the FIS Nordic World Ski Championships since 1938. Estonia was not represented at the championships from 1940 to 1991 due to the Soviet occupation and started participated again from 1993.

Years participated

 1938
 1993
 1995
 1997
 1999
 2001
 2003
 2005
 2007
 2009
 2011
 2013
 2015
 2017
 2019

Medalists

Cross country skiing

See also
 Estonia at Winter Olympic Games
 FIS Nordic World Ski Championships
 Eesti Suusaliit

References

External links
 Eesti Suusaliit 

Nations at the FIS Nordic World Ski Championships
Skiing in Estonia